Ingrid Dick (born 14 January 1972, in Melbourne, Australia) is an Australian netball player.

Playing career
She played 141 matches in the Commonwealth Bank Trophy for the Melbourne Phoenix from 1997 to 2007. She is one of only 3 players to participate in 5 Commonwealth Bank Trophy Premierships. Dick moved across Australia to take a pivotal leadership role with the West Coast Fever, based in Perth, for the inaugural ANZ Championship in 2008. She is not playing in the 2009 season.

Throughout her career she has obtained sports scholarships to the Australian Institute of Sport and Victorian Institute of Sport. Dick also has been selected in various Australian squads over the years and also played for the Australia women's national handball team.

References
Victorian Institute of Sport profile. Retrieved on 2008-06-01.
2008 West Coast Fever profile. Retrieved for 2008-06-04.

1972 births
Living people
Australian netball players
Melbourne Phoenix players
Australian Institute of Sport netball players
West Coast Fever players
ANZ Championship players
Netball players from Victoria (Australia)
Commonwealth Bank Trophy players
Victorian Institute of Sport alumni
Australian female handball players
Esso/Mobil Superleague players